Verticordia serrata is a flowering plant in the myrtle family, Myrtaceae and is endemic to the south-west of Western Australia. It is a spindly or openly branched shrub with hairy, egg-shaped leaves and flowers which are golden at first, then fade to a greyish colour.

Description

Flowering time differs, depending on the variety.

Taxonomy and naming
This species was first formally described by John Lindley in 1839 and given the name Chrysohoe serrata. The description was published in A Sketch of the Vegetation of the Swan River Colony. In 1841, Johannes Conrad Schauer changed the name to Verticordi serrata.

Alex George undertook a review of the genus Verticordia in 1991 and described three varieties of this species:
 Verticordia serrata var. ciliata  A.S.George  which has similar leaves to var. serrata but longer leaf hairs and a longer style, flowering from September to December;
 Verticordia serrata var. linearis A.S.George which has linear-shaped, pointed leaves and flowers from  September to October.

George placed this species in subgenus Chrysoma, section Sigalantha along with V. integra.

Distribution and habitat
This verticordia occurs in the south-west of Western Australia, each variety with a different range. The most widesread is var. serrata which occurs from near Perth, inland as far as Koonadgin and as far east in coastal areas as Raventhorpe. All grow in sand, often with gravel, loam or clay in shrubland and woodland, often with other species of verticordia.

Conservation
Variety linearis is classified as "Priority Three" meaning that it is poorly known and known from only a few locations but is not under imminent threat. The other two varieties are classified as "not threatened".

Use in horticulture
All three varieties can be propagated from cuttings, but var. linearis'' is the easiest to strike. All are described as "ornamental" and "attractive" and also sometimes slow-growing, appear to be hardy when established.

References

serrata
Rosids of Western Australia
Eudicots of Western Australia
Plants described in 1839